WLLH (1400 AM) is a commercial radio station in Lawrence, Massachusetts, serving the Merrimack Valley region.  The station is owned by Gois Broadcasting, LLC, and airs a tropical music radio format. The transmitter site is on Common Street, near the Lawrence Police Department Headquarters.

WLLH is also heard on FM translator W236CU at 95.1 MHz in Lowell, with its 170–watt transmitter located off Holmes Road.  The station uses its translator frequency in its moniker, "Mega 95.1 FM".

From 1937 until 2019, WLLH broadcast with an unusual configuration of synchronized dual transmitters that operated on a common frequency, which were located in Lowell and Lawrence.

History

WAGS / WLEX 
The station was first authorized as WAGS in October 1926.  It was only powered at 5 watts, broadcasting on 1200 kHz, and was licensed to Somerville, Massachusetts, near Boston. Its call letters stood for "Willow Avenue Garage Station". During September–October 1927, the station moved to Lexington, Massachusetts, and it returned to the air on October 27, 1927, as WLEX at 1390 kHz with 50 watts. It was located in the home of part-owner Carl Wheeler, who shared station ownership with Jesse Smith Dodge.

The staion time-shared with South Dartmouth station WMAF. On November 11, 1928, under the provisions of the Federal Radio Commission's General Order 40, WLEX moved to 1420 kHz with 100 watts, time-sharing with Boston-based religious station WSSH.

WLEY

Carl Wheeler's company, the Lexington Air Stations, purchased WBET from the Boston Evening Transcript and moved it from Medford to Lexington in February 1929.  The WLEX call letters were transferred to the former WBET (now WVEI in Worcester), with the original WLEX being renamed WLEY.  During this time, the stations also operated an experimental television station, W1XAY.

WLEY remained at 1420 kHz until 1930, when it moved to 1370 (concurrent with WLEX's move from 1360 to 1410 kHz). W1XAY shut down in 1930, and WLEX was sold off in 1931, but the Lexington Air Stations retained WLEY until 1933.

WLLH
The station was purchased by Alfred Moffat, who changed the call letters to WLLH on August 13, 1934, and moved the station to Lowell on October 10, 1934. Moffat boosted the station's daytime power to 250 watts from a transmitter and studio location at the Rex Center, and affiliated it with the Yankee Network; in 1936, the station also began an affiliation with the Mutual-affiliated Colonial Network.

Synchronous operation begun

Moffet also began efforts to establish a second sychronized transmitter about 9 miles (14 km) away in Lawrence, which signed on the air under special temporary authority with 100 watts on December 1, 1937, with a license for the Lawrence transmitter being issued on March 4, 1941. The Lowell transmitter was on the Merrimack River, next to the VFW Highway.

The dual WLLH transmitters moved to 1400 kHz on March 29, 1941, with the implementation of the North American Regional Broadcasting Agreement (NARBA). Ed McMahon began his career in 1942 as an announcer for WLLH.  In addition, the station began an FM sister station in 1947, 99.5 WLLH-FM (now WCRB).

A company called WLLH, Inc. acquired the stations in 1963.  In the 1960s and 70s, WLLH carried a Top 40 format with local news and weather updates.  By the 1980s, the station moved to a full service adult contemporary sound.  But as younger people switched to FM stations for their music, WLLH had to adjust its playlist.  In 1985, WLLH switched to a country music format.  The first song was "Luckenbach, Texas" by Waylon Jennings.  By the 1990s, under Arnold Lerner's Merrimack Valley Wireless Talking Machine Company, WLLH had adopted an adult standards format, and was the radio home of the Lowell Spinners minor league baseball team.

The station was sold to Mega Communications in 1999, and switched to a simulcast of Spanish-language tropical music station WNFT (1150 AM, soon renamed WAMG) that April; some of WLLH's staff, as well as Spinners games, moved to WCCM (800 AM, now WNNW).  The WAMG simulcast continued after that station moved to 890 AM in 2003, following the sale of 1150 AM (now WWDJ) to Salem Communications.

Mega sold WAMG and WLLH to J Sports in 2005.  On July 24, the stations returned to English-language programming and switched to ESPN Radio.  Most programming was simulcast on both stations, though WLLH again carried Lowell Spinners baseball, replacing WCAP, during the 2007 season; after that season, the team returned to WCAP.

WAMG and WLLH discontinued ESPN Radio programming on September 14, 2009.  The sports format was dropped, and the stations temporarily went dark.  While the station was silent, on October 9, 2009, Merrimack College announced that Merrimack Warriors ice hockey games would be broadcast on WLLH beginning on November 13.

WLLH returned to the air with test programming in late October 2009, carrying a pre-recorded loop in Spanish, with Gois Broadcasting launching the current tropical music format soon afterward.  Initially operating the station under a local marketing agreement (LMA), Gois purchased WLLH outright in January 2010.

Synchronous operation ended

Ultimately both transmitters operated at 1,000 watts using non-directional antennas on AM 1400. However, in 2019 the station lost access to the Lowell transmitter site, which had been considered its primary location. With the elimination of the Lowell operation, WLLH continued to broadcast from the formerly secondary site at Lawrence, and changed its Community of license to that city. Service to Lowell was replaced by FM translator W236CU at 95.1 MHz.

Translator

See also 
WAMG

References

External links 
 

Lawrence, Massachusetts
LLH
Mass media in Essex County, Massachusetts
Mass media in Middlesex County, Massachusetts
Radio stations established in 1926 
1926 establishments in Massachusetts

LLH
Tropical music radio stations